Dinapate is a genus of beetle native to North America.

References

Bostrichidae
Taxa named by George Henry Horn